The 1903 Princeton Tigers football team was an American football team that represented Princeton University as an independent during the 1903 college football season. In their first season under head coach Art Hillebrand, the Tigers compiled a perfect 11–0 record, shut out 10 of 11 opponents, and outscored all opponents by a total of 259 to 6. John DeWitt was the team captain.

There was no contemporaneous system in 1903 for determining a national champion. However, Princeton was retroactively named as the national champion by the Billingsley Report, Helms Athletic Foundation, Houlgate System, and Parke H. Davis, and as a co-national champion by the National Championship Foundation (NCF). Michigan was co-champion by the NCF. 

Three Princeton players were selected as consensus first-team players on the 1903 All-America team: halfback Dana Kafer; end Howard Henry; and guard John DeWitt.  DeWitt was later inducted into the College Football Hall of Fame. Other notable players included end Ralph Tipton Davis.

Schedule

References

External links
 Video of Yale game

Princeton
Princeton Tigers football seasons
College football national champions
College football undefeated seasons
Princeton Tigers football